Lawrence East is a rapid transit station on Line 3 Scarborough of the Toronto subway in Toronto, Ontario, Canada. The station is located underneath the elevated portion of Lawrence Avenue East, in the Midland Avenue and Kennedy Road corridor.

In February 2021, the TTC recommended the closure of Line 3 in 2023 and its replacement by bus service until the completion of the Scarborough extension of Line 2 Bloor–Danforth. After the closure of this station, a new Lawrence East station would be built along the planned Line 2 extension on the southwest corner of Lawrence Avenue East and McCowan Road.

History
Lawrence East opened in 1985, along with the rest of Line 3. All bus routes that operated along Lawrence Avenue East at the time were rerouted to serve the station on March 23, 1985, one day after the opening.

The station was renovated around 2011–2012 to include automated sliding doors, allowing the station to be accessible for the southbound platform and the bus platform.

Rapid transit infrastructure in the vicinity
The Line 3 tracks continue to travel on ground level, straight north after Lawrence East station, running parallel to the nearby railway tracks. South of the station, the tracks continue to travel on ground level but they become elevated shortly before reaching Kennedy station and make a 90-degree turn.

Station description

Current station
The small station is built on two levels. The Line 3 platforms, bus platforms, and only entrance are located on ground level. The entrance is an automatic sliding door facing north with a sidewalk connecting to Lawrence Avenue East to the west side, and an underpass underneath both the Line 3 and GO rails towards the commuter parking lot, Access Road, and Prudential Drive. Below ground level in the interior of the station is an underpass that connects the entrance to the northbound platforms through the means of stairs and escalators.

This station is a "half accessible" station, as all services within the station except for the northbound platform are accessible. The TTC suggests that people in need of accessible service onto the northbound platform to take Line 3 southbound to Kennedy station, and back up. An accessible fare gate is also available inside the station at the main fare booth.

The TTC plans to decommission the Line 3 portion of the existing station in 2023; however, the adjacent bus facilities will be kept in operation until 2030 with pedestrian underpass still available for the local community to use. Buses operating on the right of way will by-pass the platforms and serve customers at new stops on the south side of the existing station.

Parking

A commuter parking lot is located just east of the station, also underneath the elevated section of Lawrence Avenue East. As of 1 January 2012, the daily rate of parking from 5:00 am to 2:00 am is $3.00 on weekdays, while in the afternoon and evening rate from 3:00 pm and later is $2.00. The parking is free during weekends and statutory holidays. The capacity of the parking lot is 90 spots. Parking is managed by the Toronto Parking Authority.

Future station
The provincial transit agency Metrolinx plans to build a new underground Lawrence East station parallel to McCowan Road along a planned extension of Line 2 Bloor–Danforth. The new station will be on a north–south alignment to the west of the Scarborough General Hospital and the new bus terminal will be located on McCowan Road west of Lawrence Avenue East. The new station and bus terminal are expected to open in 2030.

Surface connections

The bus platform is located at the west side of the station. When the subway is closed, buses do not enter the station.

TTC routes serving the station include:

References

External links
 
 

Line 3 Scarborough stations
Railway stations in Canada opened in 1985